Improbable (foaled  February 11, 2016) is a champion American Thoroughbred racehorse who was the 2020 Champion Older Dirt Male after winning three Grade One races; the Hollywood Gold Cup, Whitney Stakes, and Awesome Again Stakes. He also came second in the 2020 Breeders' Cup Classic, won the 2018 Los Alamitos Futurity, and came fourth in the 2019 Kentucky Derby as the favorite.

Background
Improbable is a big powerful chestnut with a large white blaze and stockings. He was bred in Kentucky by G. Watts Humphrey Jr. and St. George Farm, owned by Ian Banwell. Improbable was sired by City Zip, a stakes-winning son of Carson City and a half-brother to champion Ghostzapper. Humphrey and Banwell had purchased Improbable's dam, Rare Event, for $400,000 as a yearling in 2010, a reflection of her excellent pedigree as a daughter of Belmont Stakes and Breeders' Cup Classic winner A.P. Indy. Improbable was her first live foal. He likely suffered oxygen deprivation during the delivery, resulting in a failure to thrive in the days after birth (sometimes called dummy foal syndrome). He required intensive medical care and developed a strong attachment to his handlers.

Improbable was sold as a weanling in 2016 for $110,000 to Taylor Made Agency, which resold him as a yearling in 2017 for $200,000 to WinStar Farm's Maverick Racing and China Horse Club. When he was later put into training with Bob Baffert in 2018, he was placed in the stall of the recently retired Triple Crown winner Justify, who looked very similar to Improbable as they were both big powerful chestnut colts with a white blaze.

Racing career

2018: Two-Year-Old Season 
Improbable's first race was on September 29, 2018, at Santa Anita Park where he went 3 wide in the final turn. After that it turned into a two horse race where he and Stretford End opened up  lengths on the rest of the field. But with 100 yards to go, Improbable put his head in front under urging, and prevailed to win by a neck. He then picked up his first stakes win in his second race, the Street Sense Stakes on November 2 at Churchill Downs. There he stayed in mid-pack for most of the race, then took over the lead in the stretch and drew off to win by  lengths.

He picked up his first Grade 1 win a month later when he won the Los Alamitos Futurity on December 8. In the race he mimicked his win in the Street Sense by staying off the pace before passing Mucho Gusto and drawing away to win by five lengths.

2019: Three-Year-Old Season 
Improbable started off the 2019 season with a second place finish in the Rebel Stakes on March 16, followed by a second place finish in the Arkansas Derby on April 13. On May 4 he competed in the 2019 Kentucky Derby, where he came in as the 4-1 favorite but finished in fifth. Due to Maximum Security's disqualification, he was moved up to fourth place. On May 18, he was the favorite in the 2019 Preakness Stakes, but finished sixth after being unruly at the start.

After a layoff, Improbable gained his first win of the 2019 season on August 25 by winning the Shared Belief Stakes. Baffert had added blinkers to keep the colt focused and told jockey Drayden Van Dyke to "just let him go."  Going off as the 5-2 favorite, Improbable stalked the early pace, then took the lead on the far turn and easily held off a late run from King Jack to win by  lengths. He then competed in the Pennsylvania Derby on September 21, where he came in fourth. To end the 2019 season, he finished fifth in the Breeders' Cup Dirt Mile on November 2.

2020: Four-Year-Old Season
Improbable started off the 2020 season on April 11 in the Oaklawn Mile Stakes. The Oaklawn Mile, an ungraded stakes race, attracted a strong field of older horses due to the COVID-19 related closures of many racetracks in the spring. It was the strongest field of older males so far that year. Improbable went off as the second betting choice behind Tom's d'Etat, who was making his first start of the year after finishing his 2019 campaign with wins in the Fayette Stakes and Clark Handicap. Improbable settled just off the early leaders while carried four wide through both turns. He briefly took the lead at the head of the stretch but was no match for Tom's d'Etat, who pulled away late to win by three-quarters of a length.

Hollywood Gold Cup
On June 6, Improbable went off as the 3-2 favorite in the Hollywood Gold Cup Stakes. He stalked the early pace, then kicked clear on the far turn to win by  lengths over Higher Power. Baffert and Van Dyke had both been confident going into the race. "It was how he has been working in the mornings," said Van Dyke. "I worked him several times going seven furlongs, and these gallop outs that he would give me, it was just unbelievable... He was sitting on a big one, and he ran a big one."

Whitney Stakes
On August 1, he faced a strong field of five in the Grade I Whitney Stakes at Saratoga Race Course. He went off at odds of 3-1, third choice behind Grade I winners Tom's d'Etat and Code of Honor, with multiple graded stakes winner By My Standards going off at 11-2. Despite acting up again in the starting gate, Improbable broke well and pressed the early pace set by long shot Mr. Buff. He went to the lead on the far turn and held off By My Standards to win by two lengths, with Tom's d'Etat a further half length back in third after stumbling out of the gate and overcoming an extremely slow early pace. Baffert, watching the race from California, noted that he'd recently seen a big change in Improbable. "We called him Little Justify last year," he said. "He was a kid. He's a man now. The distance helps."

Awesome Again Stakes
On September 26, he raced in the Awesome Again Stakes, which was a highly anticipated match up between Improbable and Maximum Security, who was the champion three-year-old male in 2019 and leading older male for most of 2020. Maximum Security became another member of the Baffert stable after his original trainer was indicted in March 2020 for doping-related charges. This time, Improbable settled at the back of the pack, as much as six lengths behind the early pace set by Take the One O One. Maximum Security was in third, pressed by the other horses in the field through a relatively brisk pace. Around the far turn, Improbable launched from dead last and circled the field to take the lead. Maximum Security tried to match the move but lacked his normal kick. The new running style seemed to work and Improbable opened up a lead and was geared down at the wire to win impressively by  lengths over Maximum Security in a final time of 1:49.01. This was his third straight Grade 1 and it gave him an automatic berth into the Breeders' Cup Classic.

Breeders' Cup Classic
After his three Grade 1 triumphs, Improbable was made the favorite for the 2020 Breeders' Cup Classic on the 7th of November. Improbable made a huge rally at the leader, Kentucky Derby and Haskell Invitational winner Authentic, but  couldn't catch him, finishing second. But because he ran on the outside and Authentic on the rail, Improbable actually ran a lot of lengths further than Authentic.

Stud career
The day after the Breeders' Cup Classic, Improbable was retired to stand at stud at WinStar Farm in 2021. His first offspring should reach the racetrack in 2024.

Racing statistics 

An asterisk after the odds means Improbable was the post-time favorite.

Pedigree

References

2016 racehorse births
Racehorses trained in the United States
Racehorses bred in Kentucky
Thoroughbred family 16-h